Operation Zarb-e-Azb was a joint military offensive conducted by the Pakistan Armed Forces against various militant groups, including the Tehrik-i-Taliban Pakistan (TTP), the Islamic Movement of Uzbekistan, the East Turkestan Islamic Movement, Lashkar-e-Jhangvi, al-Qaeda, Jundallah and Lashkar-e-Islam. The operation was launched on 15 June 2014 in North Waziristan along the Pakistan-Afghanistan border as a renewed effort against militancy in the wake of the 8 June attack on Jinnah International Airport in Karachi, for which the TTP and the IMU claimed responsibility. As of 14 July 2014, the operation internally displaced about 929,859 people belonging to 80,302 families from North Waziristan.

Part of the war in North-West Pakistan, up to 30,000 Pakistani soldiers were involved in Zarb-e-Azb, described as a "comprehensive operation" to flush out all foreign and local militants hiding in North Waziristan. The operation has received widespread support from the Pakistani political, defence and civilian sectors. As a consequence, the overall security situation improved and terrorist attacks in Pakistan dropped to a six-year low since 2008. Zarb-e-Azb was followed by Operation Radd-ul-Fasaad which began in February 2017, following a resurgence in terrorist incidents.

Etymologies
Zarb-e-Azb means "sharp and cutting strike". Azb also refers to the sword owned by the Islamic prophet Muhammad, which he used in the battles of Badr and Uhud.

Strategy
For the first time, the Pakistani military implemented a military strategy called "Seek, Destroy, Clear, Hold." The Pakistani military will seek the target. Once found, it will be destroyed. When destroyed, the infrastructure, bodies and weapons will be cleared and the area will be held both during this time and after its completion to ensure post-operation security and infrastructure rebuilding and/or area rehabilitation. The Seek and destroy component is from the Vietnam War whereas the Clear and hold component is from the Iraq War. The Pakistani military combined the two doctrines as a single doctrine for the operation to be successful.

Background

Peace negotiations
Peace negotiations with the Taliban were announced by Pakistani Prime Minister Nawaz Sharif after his election, although previous attempts to engage TTP in dialogue had failed. The first session of talks, between committees appointed by the Pakistani Government and the Taliban, was held on 26 March 2014 at Khyber Pakhtunkhwa House in Islamabad. The Taliban did not name representatives from their ranks, instead nominating pro-Taliban religious figures to present their views. The terrorists called for the implementation of Sharia in Pakistan; the Government of Pakistan demanded the cessation of hostilities, insisting that talks be held within the framework of the Pakistani constitution. A month-long ceasefire was reached on 1 March 2014.

Besides the meetings at Khyber Pakhtunkhwa House, negotiations also involved helicopter travel by government representatives to the areas under militant control near the Pakistan-Afghanistan border. The government had indicated that stronger military action would be implemented if the talks failed.

Failure
Negotiations collapsed after the execution of 23 Pakistani Frontier Corps soldiers by the Taliban on 17 February 2014. The soldiers had been held by the insurgents since 2010, and on 17 April 2014 the TTP formally ended the ceasefire.
Taliban infighting since March 2014 killed more than 90 militants. The strife, triggered by differences between the Mehsud group (led by Sheheryar Mehsud) and another TTP faction (led by Khan Said Sajna), impeded the negotiations. The negotiations were irreversibly damaged by a terrorist attack on Karachi Airport for which the Taliban claimed responsibility and which killed 28 people (including security personnel). A Pakistani military official was quoted to have said, "The army is ready for an operation."

Jinnah Airport attack

The operation began one week after a terrorist attack on Pakistan's busiest airport. On 8 June 2014, 10 militants from the Islamic Movement of Uzbekistan and TTP attacked Jinnah International Airport, Karachi, killing 28 people including security personnel and wounding at least 18.

In retaliation, the Pakistani military launched a series of air-strikes targeting terrorist hideouts in the areas bordering Afghanistan. At least 25 militants were killed on 10 June. The figure also included foreign militants killed. Two drone attacks on 12 June killed Uzbek, Afghan and local militants. On 15 June the Pakistani military intensified air-strikes and bombed eight foreign militant hideouts, killing as many as 140 militants (most Uzbek, including persons linked to the airport attack and airport attack commander and mastermind Abu Abdur Rehman Almani) in North Waziristan.

Preparations

The Pakistani military had prepared for the operation long before, and the government prepared for a three-front operation: isolating targeted militant groups, obtaining support from the political parties and saving civilians from the backlash of the operation.

Defence Minister Khawaja Asif said that the nation stood by its military: "The decision was taken after the strategy of dialogue failed. The operation will continue until it reaches its logical conclusion. Any group that challenges Pakistan's constitution, attacks civilians, soldiers, and government installations and uses Pakistani territory to plan terrorist attacks will be targeted". Asif added that internally displaced persons would be assisted by the federal and Khyber Pakhtunkhwa governments: "We will try to ensure that the displaced do not have to stay away from their homes for too long."

The combat troops encircled militant bases in the towns of Mirali and Miranshah. Pakistani officials said that the Afghan's National Security Forces (ANSF) were requested to seal the border on their side so that militants do not escape. The operation involved the Air Force, Navy artillery, tanks and ground troops. According to a military statement, "On the directions of the government, armed forces of Pakistan have launched a comprehensive operation against foreign and local terrorists who are hiding in sanctuaries in North Waziristan." An official with the military said that between 14,000 and 20,000 soldiers were normally stationed in North Waziristan before the operation, and he expected the offensive to require no more than a total of 30,000 troops.

Timeline

2014

June

July

August

September

October

November

December

2015

January

February

April

May

June

July

August

September

October

November

December

2016

January

February

March

April
On 3 April, the Pakistani government declared victory and the end of the operation after clearing 640 square kilometers in Shawal, killing some 250 terrorists.

May
Pakistan clears last militant stronghold North Waziristan Agency

June

July

August

September

October

November
1 November 2016:
Pakistan Army major was killed and six soldiers injured in a roadside IED explosion in South Waziristan Agency

December

2017

January

February

12 February 2017: 3 FC Personnel killed in South Waziristan IED Explosion

American drone strikes

Drone strikes, which were halted for six months at the request of the Pakistani government, resumed for the operation. The following drone strikes took place during the operation:

In 2014
11 June 2014: Two strikes in Miramshah killed 16 suspected militants and injured several others. These were the first drone strikes of 2014; the previous strike occurred on 25 December 2013 in the Qutab Khel area of Miramshah, killing four suspected militants.
18 June 2014: At least six militants were killed in Miramshah.
10 July 2014: A strike in the Datta Khel area killed seven militants and injured three others.
16 July 2014: Four missiles were fired in a strike in the tehsil of Datta Khel, two on a house and two on a vehicle, killing twenty militants and injuring five.
19 July 2014: Eleven militants, including two commanders, were killed in the tehsil of Madakhel, Data Khel, North Waziristan. Most of the militants belonged to the Punjabi faction of the Taliban.
6 August 2014: A strike in Datta Khel killed six militants and injured two others.
24 Sept 2014: At least 8 people including Uzbek Militants were reportedly killed in a US drone strike Dattakhel tehsil of North Waziristan.
5 October 2014: At least 5 suspected militants were killed in a US drone strike in Shawal area of South Waziristan tribal region.
6 October 2014: At least 8 suspected militant were killed and several other injured in a U.S. drone strike in Shawal district of North Waziristan.
7 October 2014: At least 3 suspected militants were killed in a U.S. drone strike in North Waziristan region.
30 October 2014: A US drone strike killed at least 4, injuring several others in Birmal Tehsil of South Waziristan.
11 November 2014: A US drone strike in Doa Toi area of Datakhel tehsil in North Waziristan Agency killed 4 suspected militants.
21 November 2014:Reportedly Five suspected militants including two commander of 'Qaedat al-Jihad in the sub-continent', a newly established branch of Al Qaeda were killed in a US Drone strike in Datakhel region of North Waziristan Agency.
6 December 2014: A US drone strike killed a key Al Qaeda leader Umar Farooq along with four others in Datakhel region of North Waziristan Agency.
26 December 2014: Two separate US Drone strikes in the Kund and Mangroti area of Shawal in North Waziristan Agency killed at least 7 suspected militants.

In 2015
4 January 2015: A reportedly high-value unidentified Uzbek commander of Taliban's Gul Bahadur group was killed along with 8 others by a US drone strike in Shawal area of North Waziristan Agency.
15 January 2015: A US drone strike reportedly killed 7 suspected militants in Wacha Dara area of Liddah Tehsil of South Waziristan Agency.
19 January 2015: A US drone strike killed 6 while injuring 4 others in the ShahiKhel area of North Waziristan's Shawwal tehsil.
28 January 2015: A US drone strike killed 7 while injuring another militant in the Shawal area of North Waziristan.
18 March 2015: A US drone strike killed a TTP commander Khawrey Mehsud along with 3 others in Shabak area of Kurram Agency.
12 April 2015: A U.S. drone strike killed 4 suspected militants in North Waziristan.
16 May 2015: A drone strike Killed 7 to 13 militants in the Mana area of North Waziristan Agency.
18 May 2015: A U.S. drone strike killed 6 suspected militants in Zoye Narye Area of North Waziristan.
2 June 2015: Four suspected militants were killed in a drone strike targeting a vehicle in the Shawal area of North Waziristan.
6 June 2015: At least nine suspected militants were killed in a strike in Shawal's Zoya Saidgai area, considered to be a hideout of the Afghan Taliban.

In 2016

In 2017

Yearly Progress

On 13 June 2015, the Pakistani military reported progress in the operation in the course of a year. DG ISPR Asim Saleem Bajwa reported that 2,763 militants had been killed so far, including 218 terrorist commanders in 9,000 intelligence based operations (IBOs). "Some 837 hideouts of terrorists have been destroyed and 253 tonnes of explosives recovered so far during the operation", he said. The Army also recovered 18,087 weapons, including heavy machine guns, light machine guns, sniper rifles, rocket launchers and AK-47s . Bajwa said that thousands of terrorists were also arrested, their strongholds cleared and their communication infrastructure destroyed. "347 officers and soldiers of Pakistan Armed Forces have embraced martyrdom", he added. The year 2015 was declared to be "a year of victory" and the operation itself a "manifestation of the resolve to root out terrorism in the country" by the Pakistani Defence Minister Khawaja Asif.

Final phase

One and a half years after the start of Zarb-e-Azb, phenomenal successes were achieved, with the last pockets close to the Pakistan-Afghan border being cleared. Terrorist backbone broken and structure dismantled. Nexus with sleeper cells largely disrupted. Intelligence based Operations (IBOs) busted remaining sleeper cells. 3,400 terrorists were killed, with 837 hideouts from where they were carrying out terrorist activities destroyed. During the last 18 months over 13,200 IBOs carried out across the country in which 183 terrorists were killed, 2,193 arrested. IBOs continue. 488 officers and men of Pakistan Army, Frontier Corps KPK, Baluchistan, Rangers Sindh were killed and 1,914 injured in Operation Zarb-e-Azb. Total 11 military courts. 142 cases referred to military courts. 55 cases decided, 87 cases in process. 31 terrorists convicted. In July, the Pakistan Army Chief, General Raheel Sharif visited the military's forward-most positions near the Afghan border in North Waziristan He was briefed about the progress and future plans for Operation Zarb-e-Azb. Sharif also visited South Waziristan and Wana agencies. It was reported that the Pakistani military had just completed the preliminary preparations for final phase. In the area around Shawal, peaks were cleared.

Management of displaced civilians
As a result of the operation, 929,859 displaced civilians (from 80,302 families) were registered by Pakistani authorities as of 14 July. Financial support, relief goods and food packages were being distributed and 59 donation points were established across Pakistan by the army.

On 10 July, the Foreign Office of Pakistan said that the rehabilitation of internally displaced persons was an internal matter and reiterated that Pakistan had not requested international assistance. "We have very clear instructions from the prime minister [to not seek external assistance], Pakistan has neither made nor intends to make a request for international assistance. It has been made very clear that all expenditure related to temporarily displaced Pakistanis will be met from our own resources", Pakistani Foreign Office spokesperson Tasnim Aslam said. However, it was reported that the United States allocated $31 million for IDPs and an additional $9.3 million for health, hygiene, water and sanitation for IDPs and livestock. It was also reported that the United Arab Emirates government allocated $20.5 million in IDP humanitarian aid.

Return of the IDPs
On 8 December 2014, the military approved the phased repatriation of the IDPs. The Pakistani army chief said the early return of the IDPs was his top priority. According to senior military officials, civilian authorities were directed to plan the return of the IDPs to their homes in areas which have been cleared of terrorists. On 31 March 2015, the repatriation started. On the first day, 219 IDPs belonging to 62 families left Bannu for Spinwam and Shahmeri in North Waziristan. In the first phase until 24 April, about 1,200 families were to return to their homes in Sinwam, Shamiri, Mirali and Bubali areas of NWA. Food ration for six months and non-food items would also be given to each household. For effective disease control, children under five years of age were administered anti-polio vaccines and under 10 years of age were administered anti-measles vaccines. As of 4 May 2015, only 230 displaced families had returned since the launch of the repatriation programme. "The civil administration can send entire displaced population back to their homes within a month if the area is de-notified as conflict zone," said an official dealing with IDPs repatriation. According to the official sources, the cut-off date for the return of IDPs was December 2016.

Reaction

Domestic

Social media
The decision by the Pakistani military to launch a comprehensive operation was widely supported, with journalists, opinion-makers, politicians and other social-media users commending the operation.

Pakistan Tehrik-e-Insaf
 - PTI chairman Imran Khan endorsed the military operation in North Waziristan as it became clear that the Taliban were not seriously negotiating. A week before, reiterating his party's stance on peace talks with militants, Imran said that an offensive in North Waziristan would unite militant forces against the Pakistani state. "Conducting such a military operation when most of the groups in NWA want talks is suicidal," Imran said in a statement, adding that most groups in North Waziristan desired peace talks with the government. The PTI position changed as it became clear that negotiations were fruitless.

Jamat-e-Islami
 - Jamat-e-Islami (JI), one of Pakistan's leading religious parties, continued to oppose any operation in North Waziristan. JI leader Siraj-ul-Haq urged the government to keep the option of negotiations with the Taliban. He warned that a military operation in North Waziristan would trigger a massive human tragedy, saying that it was the duty of Prime Minister Nawaz Sharif to consider the views of the nation and its leadership (inside and outside Parliament) before making a crucial decision affecting national security.

Muttahida Qaumi Movement
 - According to Muttahida Qaumi Movement senator Babar Khan Ghauri, "This is a commendable decision by the government. We have been repeatedly telling the current government that instead of engaging the terrorists in dialogue, government should act against these elements. Karachi has a number of terrorists and it might suffer from a blow back; this should be tackled so Karachi does not have to suffer on account of this." MQM head Altaf Hussain said, "I welcome this operation and I am glad that government is supporting the armed forces, those who have not backed the operation must realize that it is a matter of national security. I appeal to them to come on same page by setting aside their political compulsions." he said.

Awami National Party
 - Awami National Party (ANP) member Zahid Khan said, "We also held a dialogue previously (during our government) but that did not produce effective results. We wanted peace and we were okay if that came through dialogue but unfortunately that could not happen. This time, knowing from our experience, we had cautioned the government that [the] dialogue approach would not work. Government should have taken the parliament into confidence before launching the operation but it didn't."

Local tribesmen
North Waziristan tribal elders assured their support for Operation Zarb-e-Azb, according to a statement released by ISPR director-general Major General Asim Bajwa. "Many tribal elders from around Miranshah, Mir Ali, Datta Khel assure support to army operation," Bajwa tweeted. "The tribesmen have assured the army that they would not let the militant to return to the area."

Sunni Ulema Board
On 22 June 2014, more than 100 Islamic scholars issued a joint fatwa in support of the operation, calling it a jihad: "Crushing of the attempts to disrupt peaceful atmosphere in a Muslim state is jihad".

International

 – Afghan Ambassador to Pakistan Janan Mosazai stated that his government would provide "every possible assistance" to defeat the militants in the operation.
 – Interior minister Saif bin Zayed Al Nahyan said that his government would co-operate with Pakistan in the war against the extremists.
 – In a statement, the United Nations Office for the Coordination of Humanitarian Affairs (OCHA) estimated that as of 23 June more than 450,000 people were internally displaced from the war-torn region. Other UN agencies, such as the UNHCR, agreed to provide tents and other facilities to the camps. The World Health Organization (WHO) provided medicines and vaccines to the IDPs to avert a polio outbreak.
 – The US supported military operations against Taliban militants, a spokesman from the US Embassy in Pakistan said on 16 June, and the US supported every Pakistani step taken for the establishment of peace. The United States had pressured Pakistan for a military operation in North Waziristan for years, and the US Congress linked military assistance to Pakistan for the next fiscal year with military operations in North Waziristan in June 2014. Rear Adm. John Kirby, the Pentagon press secretary, said that the Pentagon was unaware of Pakistan's decision to launch a new offensive in North Waziristan: "The Pakistan military and the government understand the threat, and they continue to go after that threat." On 5 November 2014, Lt. Gen. Joseph Anderson, a senior commander for US and Nato forces in Afghanistan, said in a Pentagon-hosted video briefing from Afghanistan that the Haqqani network is now "fractured" like the Taliban. "They are fractured. They are fractured like the Taliban is. That's based pretty much on the Pakistan's operations in North Waziristan this entire summer-fall," he said, acknowledging the effectiveness of Pakistan's military offensive. "That has very much disrupted their efforts in Afghanistan and has caused them to be less effective in terms of their ability to pull off an attack in Kabul," Anderson added.
 – Chinese Foreign Minister Wang Yi said that terrorism was a problem common to China and Pakistan, since militants were the enemy of both countries, adding that China fully supported the operation.
 – Chairman of the State Duma Sergey Naryshkin commended the operation, while the Pakistani Army Chief, General Raheel Sharif was on an official visit to Russia. "We will stand by Pakistan in its fight against terrorism and extremism for stability in the region. Our relations are independent, more consistent and will further grow," he added.

TTP retaliation

Lahore

On 2 November 2014, a suicide bombing following the daily parade took place at Wagah border in Pakistan, more than 55 killed and over 200 injured. The attack was claimed by militant groups jamaat-ul-Ahrar and jundallah, sub-groups of TTP.

Peshawar

On 16 December 2014, seven gunmen belonging to the Tehrik-i-Taliban Pakistan (TTP) entered an Army Public School in Pakistani city of Peshawar and opened fire on school staff and children, killing 145 people consisting majority of students. The spokesperson of Tehrik-i-Taliban Pakistan, Mohammad Omar Khorasani, took the responsibility for the attack and said it was revenge for Operation Zarb-e-Azb.

State's Counter-retaliation

Responding to TTP's retaliatory attacks, Pakistan has mounted deadliest counter-retaliation on TTP; first removing the moratorium on executions of terrorists by the Presidential Order, and secondly establishing military courts commissions (roughly based on Gitmo). Pakistani authorities have issued "hang till death" orders to jail superintendents at the nationwide prisons. In weeks, a number of high-value detainees convicted on a terrorism charges were hanged.

Since December 2014, Pakistan's intelligence community, law enforcement agencies, antiterrorism forces, and inter-provincial police have been engaged in deadly police encounters in all over the country. News media have been televising the live actions on tracking down the militants and targeting the TTP operatives in series of police encounters. In an exchange of fire at the safe house, the KPK police and the other law enforcement agencies gunned down the six TTP fighters, including their commander and two other high-value targets who assisted in the attack. At the night of 20 December, the team of Pakistan Rangers personnel raided a safe house in Manghopir area of Karachi and killed five members of the TTP in a deadly shoot out.

On 22 December 2014, Karachi Police and the CID teams chased down and killed the TTP leader, Abid Muchar, along with his three associates in a police encounter. The same night, another action in took place in Karachi when the CID teams, in a high-speed chase in Hawke's Bay Beach, chased and apprehended five members of al-Qaeda's South Asian chapter who are suspected of planning an attack on a naval dockyard in Karachi in September.

Acting on a MI information, the navy's SSGN teams were inserted in secret hideout in Khyber Agency and stalked the six terrorists led by Saddam Jan— the mastermind of the Army Public School attack— at the midnight of 26 December 2014. In a late night operations, the SSGN combat teams reportedly hunted and killed Jan along with his six militants, while trying to seek sanctuary. An unnamed senior Pakistan government official confirmed the report.

On 9 January 2015, the CID teams gunned down the four al-Qaeda operatives after another high speed chase took place in Qayyumabad in Karachi. In another separate midnight action in Lahore, the teams of FIA's special agents, assisted by the Punjab Police, raided a house located in Burki Road. Lasting almost two-hour gun battle, the FIA teams hunted and gunned down Roohullah (alias: Asadullah)—the mastermind of the Wagah border attack along with three of his associates. Since the attack, the FIA had been on a hunt for Roohullah and was finally killed in a police encounter in Lahore.

References

2000s in Pakistan
2010s in Pakistan
2014 in Pakistan
Civil wars involving the states and peoples of Asia
Zarb-e-Azb
Islamic State of Iraq and the Levant and Pakistan
Zarb-e-Azb
Zarb-e-Azb
Pakistan Air Force
Pakistan Army
Pakistan Marines
Religion-based civil wars
Sniper warfare
Insurgency in Khyber Pakhtunkhwa
War on terror
Wars involving Pakistan
Wars involving the Taliban
Waziristan